All Saints' Church is a Church of England church in Oakleigh Road North, Oakleigh Park, London. The church is sometimes referred to as All Saints' Friern Barnet.  It is a grade II listed building.

Construction
The construction of the church was paid for by local land-owner John Miles who also donated the land on which it stands. He also provided the parish hall and the vicarage in Myddleton Park.

Architecture
The church was built in around 1883 to an Early English Gothic Revival design by the architect Joseph Clarke. The building is faced in flint with ashlar dressings. The interior  has murals by Thomas Gambier Parry.

War memorials
Inside the church are a number of plaques to the dead of the world wars. Inside the porch is a Roll of Honour to the dead of the First World War. Outside, on the corner of Oakleigh Road North and Myddelton Park road, is a memorial to the dead of both wars, known as the All Saints Church Parishioners war memorial, whose names are inscribed inside the church.

Gallery

References

External links 

Oakleigh Park
Church of England church buildings in the London Borough of Barnet
Grade II listed churches in London